The Burma Bridge may represent:

 The bridges of the Burma Railway, built by Japanese during World War II, especially those over the River Kwai (Kwai Bridge)
 The Bridge over the River Kwai, novel about building the Burma railroad bridges, as a fictionalized account
 The Bridge on the River Kwai, film about building the Burma railroad bridges, as a fictionalized account
 A hanging bridge often part of a Ropes course that consists of a single wire or rope to walk on and two others to hold on to.